Bernard Williams (December 30, 1945 – September 23, 2003) was an American basketball player who attended DeMatha Catholic High School, a college preparatory high school in Hyattsville, Maryland near Washington, D.C.  In 1965 he was a senior and a starter on the DeMatha team that beat New York City's Power Memorial Academy 46-43 on January 30.  Power, led by 7' 1" senior Lew Alcindor (later Kareem Abdul-Jabbar) had won 71 games in a row.  Sports writers at the time and later called it the greatest high school basketball game ever.

Williams went on to play at La Salle University for four years.  As a senior in 1968–69, he averaged 18.4 points per game and led La Salle to a 23-1 record and a No. 2 national ranking.  Unfortunately, the Explorers were ineligible for the NCAA and the National Invitational tournaments because of academic and recruiting violations in prior years.  In the 1969 NBA draft, Williams was selected by the San Diego Rockets. He played with the Rockets until 1971 and then played three seasons with the Virginia Squires of the American Basketball Association alongside Julius Erving.

In 1982, Williams was inducted into the Philadelphia Big 5 Hall of Fame. He died of colorectal cancer in 2002.

References

External links

1945 births
2003 deaths
American men's basketball players
Basketball players from Washington, D.C.
DeMatha Catholic High School alumni
La Salle Explorers men's basketball players
Parade High School All-Americans (boys' basketball)
Point guards
San Diego Rockets draft picks
San Diego Rockets players
Virginia Squires players